La Grande Fache, Gran Facha or Cuspide de Bachimaña is a summit in the Pyrenees, culminating at 3,005 m, situated on the French-Spanish border and on the pyrenean watershed.

Topography 
It rises at the centre of the cirques of Marcadau, Piedrafita and Bachimaña, and is surrounded by many lakes or Ibóns.

Given its high altitude and pyramidal form, it is a well climbed summit.

History 
The first ascent was made by Henry Russell and guide Cauterets Latour in the summer of 1874.

Access 
From France, a path starts from the Wallon valley and another from the zone de Respomuso (cirque de Piedrafita).
From Spain, the path starts at la Sarra marsh (Sallent de Gállego), goes past the Respumuso dam, the ibón de Campoplano, the Ibóns de la Fache, the port de la Fache and ends by steep slopes up to the summit.

References 

Mountains of the Pyrenees
Mountains of Hautes-Pyrénées
Pyrenean three-thousanders